Politics of Wikipedia may refer to:

 Ideological bias on Wikipedia, the real or perceived ideological biases of Wikipedia editors
 Wikipedia coverage of American politics
 The political and economic views of Jimmy Wales, Wikipedia founder
 Political editing on Wikipedia
 United States congressional staff edits to Wikipedia, politically motivated conflict-of-interest edits to the project by United States Congressional staff
 Deletionism and inclusionism in Wikipedia, opposing philosophies about inclusion of articles within Wikipedia's editing community

See also

 Censorship of Wikipedia
 Criticism of Wikipedia